The Fiat G.80 was a military jet trainer developed in Italy in the 1950s, and was that country's first true jet-powered aircraft. It was a conventional low-wing monoplane with retractable tricycle undercarriage and engine air intakes on the fuselage sides. The pilot and instructor sat in tandem under a long bubble canopy.

Design and development
Two G.80 prototypes were followed by three preproduction machines, but the Aeronautica Militare found it unsuitable for their requirements and did not purchase it in quantity. Undeterred, Fiat developed a more refined version, dubbed the G.82, for entry in a NATO competition to select a standard jet trainer. Apart from many detail changes, the G.82 featured a longer fuselage, a Rolls-Royce Nene engine in place of the G.80's de Havilland Goblin, and wingtip tanks. 

Five aircraft were constructed, but when the competition was cancelled and the G.82 was not selected by either NATO or the Aeronautica Militare, the development programme was finally terminated. Plans for specialised versions including night fighter, reconnaissance, and close-support aircraft went unrealised, as did the G.84 that was to have been powered by an Allison J35. The G.82s were used for a few years by the Aeronautica Militares training school at Amendola before being handed over to the Reparto Sperimentale Volo ("Department of Experimental Flight") in 1957.

Variants
 G.80-1B - prototype (two built)
 G.80-3B - pre-production version (three built)
 G.81 - definitive production version of G.80 (not built, development cancelled in favour of G.82)
 G.82 - prototypes for NATO competition (two built) and four production
 G.84 - Allison J35-powered version (not built)

Operators

 Italian Air Force

Specifications (G.82)

See also
 Vittorio Sanseverino, the test pilot who flew the aircraft on its maiden flight.

References

 
 
 Italian Defence Department fact sheet (PDF format)
 Уголок неба

G.080
Abandoned military aircraft projects of Italy
1950s Italian military trainer aircraft
FiatG.82
Single-engined jet aircraft
Low-wing aircraft
Aircraft first flown in 1951